Tatyana Mikhailovna Markvo (later Rakovshchik, born 8 August 1941) is a retired Russian rower who won five medals in double and quad sculls at the European championships of 1966–1971. Her husband Leonid Rakovshchik also competed internationally in rowing.

References

1941 births
Living people
Russian female rowers
Soviet female rowers
European Rowing Championships medalists